Israel competed at the 2006 Winter Olympics in Turin, Italy.

Five Israeli athletes participated in the games, the same as in Salt Lake City in 2002, including two ice dance couples: Galit Chait and Sergei Sakhnovski, who were taking part for the third time in the Olympics, and the brother and sister team of Alexandra and Roman Zaretski for whom this was the first Olympics. The fifth member of the team was an alpine skier, Mikail Renzhin, the first Israeli to participate in this sport in the Olympics. He competed in the men's slalom and giant slalom events.

Galit Chait was the flag-bearer in the opening ceremony, as she was in 2002.

Results by event

Alpine skiing

Figure skating 

Key: CD = Compulsory Dance, FD = Free Dance, FS = Free Skate, OD = Original Dance, SP = Short Program

References

Nations at the 2006 Winter Olympics
2006 Winter Olympics
Winter Olympics